Rottal Auto AG is a company based in Ruswil, Switzerland which provides bus services in the Canton of Lucerne. The company operates commercial daytime services, as well as routes on the Nachstern network in the Luzern area, in conjunction with Verkehrsbetriebe Luzern.

Fleet
As of January 2014 the fleet consisted of 30+ vehicles

See also
Verkehrsbetriebe Luzern
Auto AG Rothenburg

External links
Official site
Nachstern network

Bus companies of Switzerland